

Final standings

ACC tournament
See 1960 ACC men's basketball tournament

NCAA tournament

Round of 25
Duke        84, Princeton       60

Regional semi-finals
Duke        58, Saint Joseph's    56

Regional finals
New York U 74, Duke            59

ACC's NCAA record
2–1

NIT
League rules prevented ACC teams from playing in the NIT, 1954–1966

External links
 https://web.archive.org/web/20080619014216/http://www.sportsstats.com/bball/standings/1960